The Michael government was formed by Alun Michael following the 1999 National Assembly for Wales election and was a Labour minority government.

Cabinet

References

Welsh governments
Ministries of Elizabeth II